Putnam Park may refer to 

 Putnam Park, a natural area owned by the University of Wisconsin–Eau Claire
 Putnam Memorial State Park, in Redding, Connecticut
 Helen Putnam Regional Park, a regional park southwest of Petaluma, California